Loïc Abenzoar (born 14 February 1989) is a French footballer. He currently plays for Villefranche in Championnat National as a right back. He is a France youth international having earned caps with all of the youth teams beginning with the under-16 team.

Career
Abenzoar joined Lyon, his hometown club, in 2000. On 12 June 2009, he signed his first professional contract agreeing to a three-year deal.
He made his professional debut on 14 August 2010 in a league match against Lens, while playing on loan with Arles-Avignon. He went from Hønefoss, Norway in 2014 to Fredrikstad, Norway on March 17, 2015  In November 2016 he joined Villefranche.

Career statistics

References

External links
 Loïc Abenzoar profile at olweb.fr
 

1989 births
Living people
French footballers
Footballers from Lyon
Olympique Lyonnais players
AC Arlésien players
Vannes OC players
Ligue 1 players
Championnat National players
Championnat National 2 players
Hønefoss BK players
Fredrikstad FK players
FC Villefranche Beaujolais players
Norwegian First Division players
France youth international footballers
Competitors at the 2009 Mediterranean Games
Association football fullbacks
Mediterranean Games competitors for France